The Bird of Music is the second studio album by American indie pop band Au Revoir Simone. It was released on March 5, 2007, on the Moshi Moshi label in the UK, and on the trio's own Our Secret Record Company label in the US.

Track listing 
 "The Lucky One" - 4:30
 "Sad Song" - 4:07
 "Fallen Snow" - 3:45
 "I Couldn't Sleep" - 2:31
 "A Violent Yet Flammable World" - 5:01
 "Don't See the Sorrow" - 4:30
 "Dark Halls" - 3:26
 "Night Majestic" - 3:00
 "Stars" - 2:58
 "Lark" - 4:19
 "The Way to There" - 6:49

References 

2007 albums
Au Revoir Simone albums
Moshi Moshi Records albums